Mahmud ibn Sa'd was an architect who lived in the 13th–14th centuries. Among his works are old Bibi-Heybat Mosque (demolished in 1936), Nardaran Fortress and Molla Ahmad Mosque in Baku's Old City, all three in the modern-day Republic of Azerbaijan.

References

Year of birth unknown
Year of death unknown
14th-century architects